Yuja Wang (born February 10, 1987) is a Chinese classical pianist. She was born in Beijing, began studying piano there at age six, and went on to study at the Central Conservatory of Music in Beijing and the Curtis Institute of Music in Philadelphia. By the age of 21, she was already an internationally recognized concert pianist, giving recitals around the world. She has a recording contract with Deutsche Grammophon. Wang tours internationally, and has received critical praise for her performances. Yuja Wang lives in New York City.

Early life

Wang comes from an artistic family. Her mother, Zhai Jieming, is a dancer and her father, Wang Jianguo, is a percussionist. Both live in Beijing.

Wang began studying piano at age six. At age seven, she began seven years of study at Beijing's Central Conservatory of Music. At 11, Wang entered the Morningside Music Bridge International Music Festival (at Mount Royal University in Calgary, Alberta) as the festival's youngest student.

At age 15, Wang entered the Curtis Institute of Music in Philadelphia, where she studied for five years with Gary Graffman and graduated in 2008. Graffman said that Wang's technique impressed him during her audition, but "it was the intelligence and good taste" of her interpretations that distinguished her.

Career

Early career
In 1998 (aged 11), Wang won third prize in the Ettlingen International Competition for Young Pianists in Ettlingen, Germany. In 2001, in the piano section at the first Sendai International Music Competition in Sendai, Japan she won third prize and the special jury prize (awarded to a particularly superior finalist less than 20 years of age, with prize money of 500,000 Japanese yen).

In 2002, Wang won the Aspen Music Festival concerto competition.

In 2003, Wang made her European debut with the Tonhalle Orchester Zürich, Switzerland, playing Beethoven's Piano Concerto No. 4 under the baton of David Zinman. She made her North American debut in Ottawa in the 2005–2006 season, replacing Radu Lupu performing that Beethoven concerto with Pinchas Zukerman conducting.

On September 11, 2005, Wang was named a 2006 biennial Gilmore Young Artist Award winner, given to the most promising pianists age 22 and younger. As part of the award, she received $15,000, appeared at Gilmore Festival concerts, and had a new piano work commissioned for her.

In 2006, Wang made her New York Philharmonic debut at the Bravo! Vail Music Festival. The following season, she performed with the orchestra under Lorin Maazel during a tour of Japan and Korea by the Philharmonic.

In March 2007, Wang's breakthrough came when she replaced Martha Argerich in concerts held in Boston. Argerich had cancelled her appearances with the Boston Symphony Orchestra on four subscription concerts from March 8 to 13. Wang performed Tchaikovsky's Piano Concerto No. 1 with Charles Dutoit conducting.

After 2007

In 2008, Wang toured the U.S. with the Academy of St Martin in the Fields led by Sir Neville Marriner. In 2009, she performed as a soloist with the YouTube Symphony Orchestra, led by Michael Tilson Thomas at Carnegie Hall. Wang performed with the Lucerne Festival Orchestra conducted by Claudio Abbado in Beijing, the Royal Philharmonic Orchestra in Spain and in London, and the Hong Kong Philharmonic Orchestra.

In 2009, Wang performed and recorded Mendelssohn's Piano Concerto in G Minor with Kurt Masur at the Verbier Festival, accompanied by Kirill Troussov, David Aaron Carpenter, Maxim Rysanov, Sol Gabetta, and Leigh Mesh. Her performance of Rimsky-Korsakov's "Flight of the Bumblebee" is featured on the Verbier Festival highlights DVD from 2008.

In 2012, Wang toured with the Israel Philharmonic Orchestra and conductor Zubin Mehta in Israel and the U.S., with a performance at Carnegie Hall in New York in September.

Wang toured Asia in November 2012 with the San Francisco Symphony and its conductor Michael Tilson Thomas.

In February 2013, Wang performed and recorded Prokofiev's Concerto No. 2 and Rachmaninoff's Concerto No. 3 with Conductor Gustavo Dudamel and the Venezuelan Orquesta Sinfónica Simón Bolívar. Also in 2013, Wang's recital tour of Japan culminated with her recital debut at Tokyo's Suntory Hall.

Wang made her Berlin Philharmonic debut in May 2015, performing Sergei Prokofiev's 2nd Piano Concerto with Conductor Paavo Järvi. The performance was broadcast live through the orchestra's Digital Concert Hall.

In a departure from her previously predominantly Russian repertoire, she played Mozart's Piano Concerto No. 9, the Jeunehomme, in February 2016 at David Geffen Hall in New York on four successive nights with Charles Dutoit conducting, then, in her debut with the Vienna Philharmonic under Valery Gergiev in Munich and Paris. In March 2016, Wang played for three nights in Messiaen's Turangalîla-Symphonie with Esa-Pekka Salonen conducting.

Wang performed with the National Youth Orchestra of China for its Carnegie Hall premiere on July 22, 2017, with conductor Ludovic Morlot of the Seattle Symphony, performing Tchaikovsky's Piano Concerto No. 1 in B-Flat Minor.

Orchestras and performances
In 2019, she paid tribute to Kennedy Center Honoree Michael Tilson Thomas with a rendition of "You Come Here Often?"

As of 2020, Wang has performed with many orchestras in the U.S., including Boston, Chicago, Cleveland, Los Angeles, New York, Philadelphia, San Francisco, Santa Cruz, and Washington. Internationally, she has performed with the Berlin Philharmonic, Staatskapelle Berlin, Hong Kong Philharmonic Orchestra, China Philharmonic, Filarmonica Della Scala, Toronto Symphony Orchestra, Israel Philharmonic, London Philharmonic, Oslo Philharmonic, Orchestre de Paris, Orquesta Nacional de España, Orquesta Sinfónica Simón Bolívar, the NHK Symphony in Tokyo, Royal Concertgebouw Orchestra, Orchestra Mozart, and Santa Cecilia.

World Premieres
Works written for and premiered by Wang include the following:
 Artless Pages (Seven Impromptus for Piano) by Rodion Shchedrin: Église de Verbier in Verbier, Switzerland (1 August 2009) 
 Piano Concerto by Jennifer Higdon: National Symphony Orchestra conducted by Andrew Litton, Kennedy Center in Washington, D.C., United States (3 December 2009) 
 You Come Here Often? for solo piano by Michael Tilson Thomas: Barbican Centre in London, United Kingdom (15 March 2015) 
 Farewell My Concubine for Peking Opera Soprano and Piano by Tan Dun: Guangzhou Symphony Orchestra conducted by Long Yu, Xinghai Concert Hall in Guangzhou, China (31 July 2015) 
 Must the Devil Have All the Good Tunes? by John Adams: Los Angeles Philharmonic conducted by Gustavo Dudamel, Walt Disney Concert Hall in Los Angeles, USA (7 March 2019) 
 Piano Concerto by Teddy Abrams: Louisville Orchestra conducted by Teddy Abrams, Kentucky Center for the Performing Arts in Louisville, USA (7 January 2022) 
 Piano Concerto No. 3 by Magnus Lindberg: San Francisco Symphony conducted by Esa-Pekka Salonen, Davies Symphony Hall in San Francisco, USA (13 October 2022) 

Other pieces that received world premieres with Wang as soloist include the following:
 Cello Sonata by Evgeny Kissin: with cellist Gautier Capuçon, Salle des Combins in Verbier, Switzerland (25 July 2016) 
 The food of love by Carlo Galante: Filarmonica della Scala conducted by Daniele Rustioni, La Scala in Milan, Italy (23 February 2015)

Discography

In January 2009, Wang signed a recording contract with Deutsche Grammophon.

Although there are reports Wang released a debut CD in 1995, there is little information available about it.

 2009: Sonatas & Etudes
 2009: Mendelssohn Piano Concerto No. 1 with Verbier Festival Orchestra conducted by Kurt Masur – live at Verbier Festival, Switzerland
 2009: Prokofiev Piano Concerto No. 3 with Lucerne Festival Orchestra conducted by Claudio Abbado – live at Lucerne Festival, Switzerland
 2010: Transformation
 2010: Schubert, Schumann, Scriabin and Prokofiev – live at Verbier Festival, Switzerland
 2011: Rachmaninov Piano Concerto No. 2 & Rhapsody on a Theme of Paganini with Mahler Chamber Orchestra conducted by Claudio Abbado – live in Ferrara, Italy
 2011: Rachmaninov Piano Concerto No. 2 with Verbier Festival Orchestra conducted by Yuri Temirkanov – live at Verbier Festival, Switzerland
 2012: Fantasia
 2014: Rachmaninov Piano Concerto No. 3 & Prokofiev Piano Concerto No. 2 with Orquesta Sinfónica Simón Bolívar de Venezuela conducted by Gustavo Dudamel – live in Caracas, Venezuela
 2014: Brahms: The Violin Sonatas with Leonidas Kavakos
 2015: Maurice Ravel Complete Orchestral Works with Tonhalle-Orchester Zürich conducted by Lionel Bringuier
 2017: The Asia Tour with Berliner Philharmoniker conducted by Sir Simon Rattle – live in Wuhan, China
 2018: The Berlin Recital – live from Berlin, Germany
 2018: The Peace Concert Versailles with Wiener Philharmoniker conducted by Franz Welser-Möst – live at Palace of Versailles, France
 2019: Blue Hour with Andreas Ottensamer
 2019: Sommernachtskonzert: Gershwin Rhapsody in Blue with Wiener Philharmoniker conducted by Gustavo Dudamel – live at Schönbrunn Palace, Austria
 2019: Franck, Chopin with Gautier Capuçon
 2020: Adams Must the Devil Have All the Good Tunes? with Los Angeles Philharmonic conducted by Gustavo Dudamel
 2020: Rachmaninov Cello Sonata, Op. 19 with Lynn Harrell – live at Verbier Festival 2008

Reviews
In a review of her 2011 Carnegie Hall debut, The New York Times wrote:

In June 2012, Joshua Kosman of the San Francisco Chronicle wrote that Wang is "quite simply, the most dazzlingly, uncannily gifted pianist in the concert world today, and there's nothing left to do but sit back, listen and marvel at her artistry."

From a May 2013 Carnegie Hall concert, The New York Times reported that Wang's "fortissimos were fearsome, but so, in a quieter way, were the longing melodic lines of the first movement of Rachmaninoff's Sonata No. 2." The reviewer added:

The liquidity of her phrasing in the second movement of Scriabin's Sonata No. 2 eerily evoked the sound of woodwinds. In that composer's Sonata No. 6 she juxtaposed colors granitic and gauzy to eerily brilliant effect before closing the written program with a rabid rendition of the one-piano version of "La valse", accentuating the sickliness of Ravel's distorted waltzes.

In May 2016, The New York Times reviewed her performance of Beethoven's Hammerklavier Sonata:

Ms. Wang's virtuosity goes well beyond the uncanny facility. Right through this Beethoven performance she wondrously brought out intricate details, inner voices, and harmonic colorings. The first movement had élan and daring. The scherzo skipped along with mischievousness and rhythmic bite. In the grave, with great slow movement, she played with restraint and poignancy. She kept you on edge during the elusive transition to the gnarly, dense fugue, which she then dispatched with unfathomable dexterity.

This was not a probing or profound Hammerklavier. But I admired Ms. Wang's combination of youthful energy and musical integrity.

Wang has received attention for her eye-catching outfits and glamorous stage presence as well as for her piano playing. In a much-quoted 2011 review of a concert at the Hollywood Bowl, Los Angeles Times classical music critic Mark Swed wrote:

Swed was criticized for this aspect of his review in a Washington Post article titled "Which offends? Her short dress or critic's narrow view?".

In 2017, Michael Levin of the HuffPost described Wang after her concert with Leonidas Kavakos at David Geffen Hall as "one of the most talented, enthralling, and even mesmerizing performers on the world scene".

Awards
 2006: Gilmore Young Artist Award
 2009: Gramophone Young Artist of the Year
 2009, 2011, 2018, 2019 Grammy Award nominee
 2010: Avery Fisher Career Grant Recipient
 2011: Echo Klassik Young Artist of the Year
 2017: Musical America Artist of the Year 2017
 2019: Gramophone Instrumental Award for The Berlin Recital
 2021: Opus Klassik Award in Concert Recording (Piano) for John Adams: Must the Devil Have All the Good Tunes?, with Los Angeles Philharmonic conducted by Gustavo Dudamel

See also
 Chinese people in New York City

References

External links

 
 Yuja Wang Archives
 

1987 births
21st-century Chinese musicians
21st-century Chinese women musicians
21st-century classical pianists
Chinese classical pianists
Chinese expatriates in the United States
Chinese women pianists
Curtis Institute of Music alumni
Deutsche Grammophon artists
Living people
Musicians from Beijing
People's Republic of China musicians
Women classical pianists
Gilmore Young Artist Award winners
21st-century women pianists